Meli Valdés Sozzani (La Plata, 1977) is an Argentine artist.

Biography 
María Amelia Valdés Sozzani was born in La Plata, Buenos Aires Province, Argentina, in 1977.

She starts painting at an early age making her first solo exhibition in 1996. Her early works are influenced by surrealism, although of a very personal nature, already evidencing an interest  in the symbolic, rather than dreamlike, content of images. These concepts will be characteristic of her future work.

In 1998 a series of her paintings is exhibited in Artexpo New York City, at the Jacob K. Javits Center in New York (Art BusinessNews Show Preview, Feb. 1998, ISSN 0273-5652). On that occasion she receives the Artist Pavilion Award in recognition to the originality of her work.
Her works have been exhibited in her country, the United States and Italy.

In 2006 in collaboration with the Argentine writer Alejandro Córdoba Sosa, makes a series of forty illustrations based on the flash fiction stories that make up the book Doscientos y un cuentos en miniatura (Two hundred and one miniature stories).

In 2013, on the occasion of the seventh centenary of the birth of Giovanni Boccaccio made a series of paintings inspired by the Decameron.

Style 

Figuration in Meli Valdés Sozzani's art is a means to explore the deeper realities behind the concrete in order to reveal the subtle frame that hides behind the sensible world. Time, a constant theme in her work, results in enigmatic images of moving lyricism.
Her paintings are also characterized by high brightness and chromatic richness.

References

External links

1977 births
Living people
20th-century Argentine painters
20th-century Argentine women artists
21st-century Argentine women artists
Argentine women painters
Contemporary painters
People from La Plata